Višnjevac is a village located in the Subotica municipality, in the North Bačka District of Serbia. It is situated in the autonomous province of Vojvodina. The village is ethnically mixed and its population numbering 639 people (2002 census).

Name
In Serbian the settlement is known as Višnjevac (Вишњевац), in Hungarian as Meggyes, in Bunjevac as Višnjevac, and in Croatian as Višnjevac. It was also known as Radivojevićevo (Радивојевићево).

Ethnic groups (2002)

Serbs = 302 (47.26%)
Hungarians = 224 (35.06%)
Bunjevci = 41 (6.42%)
Montenegrins = 23 (3.60%)
Yugoslavs = 21 (3.29%)
Romani = 8 (1.25%)
Croats = 7 (1.10%)

Historical population

1961: 694
1971: 668
1981: 703
1991: 634

References

Slobodan Ćurčić, Broj stanovnika Vojvodine, Novi Sad, 1996.

See also
List of places in Serbia
List of cities, towns and villages in Vojvodina

Places in Bačka
Subotica